Nakia Davis-Welsh (born 22 May 1996) is an Australian rugby league player who currently plays for the Glebe Dirty Reds in the NSWRL Women's Premiership.

Background
Born in Kempsey, New South Wales, Davis-Welsh is the daughter of former Balmain Tigers five-eighth Paul Davis and the cousin of Australian and Queensland representative Greg Inglis. She attended Hunter Sports High and only began playing organised rugby league in 2012.

Playing career
In 2013, Davis-Welsh, aged 16 at the time, represented the Indigenous All Stars in the annual women's All Stars match.

In 2016, she made her debut for New South Wales in the annual Women's Interstate Challenge against Queensland.

In 2017, she played at fullback in the Redfern All Blacks' NSW Women's Premiership Grand Final win over North Newcastle. She finished as the top try scorer in the competition.

In October 2017, she was named in Australia's 2017 Women's Rugby League World Cup squad. She made her international debut in Australia's opening round win over the Cook Islands. On 2 December, she started at fullback in the Jillaroos 23-16 final win over the New Zealand. She played four games in the tournament, scoring three tries.

In June 2018, Davis-Welsh was announced as one of fifteen marquee signings by the Sydney Roosters women's team which participated in the inaugural NRL Women's Premiership in September 2018. She did not play a match during the season, as it was revealed in October 2018 that she had fallen pregnant.

References

External links

1996 births
Living people
People from the Mid North Coast
Australian female rugby league players
Australia women's national rugby league team players
Indigenous Australian rugby league players
Rugby league fullbacks
Sydney Roosters (NRLW) players
Rugby league players from New South Wales